Yapton is a village and civil parish in the Arun District of West Sussex, England. It is centred three miles (4.8 km) north east of Bognor Regis at the intersection of the B2132 and B2233 roads.

The parish of Yapton lies on the coastal plain south west of Arundel, between the South Downs and the sea. St Mary the Virgin parish church, 13th century or earlier in origin, is in the centre of the village. It houses a twelfth-century font.  Nearby, Yapton Free Church was built in 1861 as a Congregational chapel but is now Evangelical in character.  Yapton C of E Primary School was founded in 1864.

Other settlements in the parish include Bilsham and Flansham. The settlement of Bilsham was listed in the Domesday Book of 1086 as having 14 households. Bilsham Chapel is a deconsecrated former chapel of ease to St Mary the Virgin Church; it dates from the 13th–14th century but fell out of use in the mid-16th century.  The building is now a house.

History

The disused Portsmouth and Arundel Canal which linked nearby the River Arun to Chichester Harbour, runs through the village. This was built primarily on the financial case it would be a safe inland shipping route between London and Portsmouth avoiding the then risk of attack in the English Channel by the French.  Throughout its lifetime, 1823-1855 - a time when the Wey and Arun Canal was open (having opened 7 years earlier and having closed in 1871) - the route was used for transporting agricultural goods and munitions, for instance, from Chilworth and Hanworth gunpowder works and to/from the military docks on the lower Thames in the Royal Borough of Greenwich.

Governance
An electoral ward in the same name exists. This ward stretches South East to Climping with a total population of 5,926 at the 2011 Census.

Notable residents 
Duncan Goodhew, the Olympic swimming maestro was brought up in Yapton. There is a residential road, Goodhew Close, named after him. Sculptor Ginger Gilmour works from a 15th-century farmhouse near Yapton, where she has created several studios. The poet Andrew Young lived in Yapton after he retired in 1959.

References

External links

British History Online
Local Heritage Initiative

Villages in West Sussex
Arun District